Zinaidino is a rural locality (a selo) and the administrative center of Zinaidinskoye Rural Settlement, Rakityansky District, Belgorod Oblast, Russia. The population was 703 as of 2010. There are 12 streets.

Geography 
Zinaidino is located 8 km northeast of Rakitnoye (the district's administrative centre) by road. Novozinaidinskoye is the nearest rural locality.

References 

Rural localities in Rakityansky District